The Nassau Nature Park is a nature park in the southwestern Westerwald and the northwestern Taunus area of the German state of Rhineland-Palatinate, located within the historical state of Nassau and including the town Nassau. It comprises 561.71 km². The nature park was officially established in 1963. The area is noted for its scenic landscape and medieval castles, and is a popular tourist destination.

The Rhine Gorge UNESCO world heritage site is part of the Nassau Nature Park.

References

External links 
 Nassau Nature Park

Nature parks in Rhineland-Palatinate
Protected areas established in 1963
1963 establishments in West Germany